Linda Ruth Petzold (born 1954) is a professor of computer science and mechanical engineering at the University of California, Santa Barbara, where she is also listed as affiliated faculty in the department of mathematics. Her research concerns differential algebraic equations and the computer simulation of large real-world social and biological networks.

Education
Petzold did both her undergraduate and graduate studies at the University of Illinois at Urbana–Champaign, earning a bachelor's degree in mathematics and computer science 1974 and a doctorate in computer science in 1978 under the supervision of C. William Gear.

Recognition
Petzold was the first winner of the J. H. Wilkinson Prize for Numerical Software, for her work on DASSL, a system for the numerical solution of differential algebraic equations. In 2011 she won the SIAM/ACM Prize in Computational Science and Engineering.

She was elected a member of the National Academy of Engineering in 2004 "for advances in the numerical solution of differential/algebraic equations and their incorporation into widely distributed software." She became a Fellow of the Society for Industrial and Applied Mathematics in 2009 and of the Association for Computing Machinery in 2013; She is also a fellow of the American Society of Mechanical Engineers and of the American Association for the Advancement of Science.  She was elected to the National Academy of Sciences in 2021.

In January 2015 she was given an honorary doctorate by Uppsala University.

References

Further reading

External links
Google scholar profile

1954 births
Living people
American computer scientists
American mechanical engineers
20th-century American mathematicians
21st-century American mathematicians
American women computer scientists
American women mathematicians
University of Illinois Urbana-Champaign alumni
University of California, Santa Barbara faculty
Fellows of the American Association for the Advancement of Science
Fellows of the American Society of Mechanical Engineers
Fellows of the Association for Computing Machinery
Fellows of the Society for Industrial and Applied Mathematics
Members of the United States National Academy of Engineering
Members of the United States National Academy of Sciences
20th-century women mathematicians
21st-century women mathematicians
20th-century American women
21st-century American women